Ibian Hodgson (born 30 June 1993) is an Aruban tennis player. Hodgson studied at Wichita State University from 2013–14. Hodgson has represented Aruba at the Davis Cup, where he has a win-loss record of 0–8. Hodgson has a career-high ITF juniors ranking of 349, achieved on 21 March 2011.

Davis Cup

Participations: (0–8)

   indicates the outcome of the Davis Cup match followed by the score, date, place of event, the zonal classification and its phase, and the court surface.

References

External links

1993 births
Living people
Aruban sportsmen
Wichita State Shockers men's tennis players
Aruban expatriate sportspeople in the United States
Male tennis players